Madison-Plains High School is a public high school near London, Ohio (Madison County).  It is the only high school in the Madison-Plains Local School District.

Other information
Nicknamed the Golden Eagles, the high school uses the colors Green & Gold with sub-colors of Black & White.
Appropriately, the school uses the Eagle as a school logo for most sporting events and "spirit gear".
The school's secondary logo is a basic print of the block letters MP (for Madison Plains).

External links
 District Website
 High School Website
Athletic Website - MPGoldenEagles.com

Notes and references

High schools in Madison County, Ohio
Public high schools in Ohio